Khalid Al-Qahtani (born 28 January 1997) is a Saudi Arabian professional footballer who plays as a forward.

Career

Al-Shabab
Al-Qahtani started his career at Al-Shabab and is a product of the Al-Shabab's youth system. On 6 April 2018, Al-Qahtani made his professional debut for Al-Shabab against Al-Taawoun in the Pro League, replacing Amr Barakat .

Al-Riyadh
On 20 February 2019, signed with Al-Riyadh.

Career statistics

Club

References

External links 
 

1997 births
Living people
Saudi Arabian footballers
Al-Shabab FC (Riyadh) players
Al-Riyadh SC players
Saudi Professional League players
Saudi Second Division players
Association football forwards